Wolfgang Wild may refer to:
 Wolfgang "Chris" Wild, English curator, writer and speaker
 Wolfgang Wild, German nuclear physicist, academic administrator and politician